Lumene is a Finnish manufacturer of cosmetics, based in Kauklahti, Espoo. Majority of the Lumene products are developed and manufactured in Finland. The company's key markets are Finland, Scandinavia, UK and China. As of September 2021 the main owner of the company is a Nordic capital investor Verdane. The name of the brand is inspired by Lake Lummenne in Kuhmoinen, Central Finland.

Sustainability 
Lumene is a pioneer in circular beauty. The goal is to create a sustainable forerunner product portfolio in accordance with circular economy principles. The sustainability of each product renovation is being improved compared to the previous launch. Of the 42 ingredients from the Nordic nature, 50% is upcycled from the food and forest industries. Factory emissions have been cut by 92% between 2019-2021. The company aims to be carbon neutral by 2025. 100% of the strategic skincare packaging will be recyclable by 2025. Lumene is the leading beauty brand in Sustainable Brand Index 2022 in Finland. Completed 4-pillar SMETA audit and the impact assessment of B Corp in 2022. 

Between 2007 and 2019, Lumene reduced their water usage in their products by 40 percent.Their products contain sustainable Arctic Spring Water. The water is filtered through sand and gravel layers before being collected from a hole in the ice. The water has low mineral content, making it a neutral base for other active ingredients. 

In 2010, the company began a WaterSmart program to help reduce water consumption. Between 2007 and 2019, Lumene reduced the use of water in their production by 40 percent.

in 2021, Lumene replaced microplastics in its exfoliating products with Finnish birch bark.

References

External links
 http://www.lumene.com

Cosmetics companies
Manufacturing companies based in Espoo